Afroarabiella buchanani is a moth in the family Cossidae. It is found in Niger.

References

Natural History Museum Lepidoptera generic names catalog

Cossinae
Moths described in 1921
Moths of Africa